Josephine Forbes (born 20 August 1970) is an Australian scientist specialising in the study of glycation and diabetes. She has been studying diabetes since 1999 and has worked at Royal Children's Hospital, University of Melbourne and Baker Heart and Diabetes Institute in Melbourne Australia. Since 2012 she has led the Glycation and Diabetes team at Mater Research which is a world-class medical research institute based at South Brisbane, and part of the Mater Group. Josephine is program leader for Mater's Chronic Disease Biology and Care theme, building greater understanding of the biological basis of a broad range of chronic diseases, and developing preventative strategies and innovative treatments to improve patient outcomes. Josephine and her team focus on how advanced glycation contributes to the pathogenesis of diabetes and its complications such as kidney disease.

Biography 
Professor Forbes currently leads a team of post-doctoral researchers and supervises numerous students, in addition to being a professor of medicine at the University of Queensland and a principal research fellow in the Department of Medicine at the University of Melbourne.

Education 
Forbes was awarded her PhD in Nephrology in 1999 from the University of Melbourne, for research carried out at the Royal Children's Hospital. She is currently an NHMRC Senior Research Fellow and has held research grants from the NHMRC of Australia, the Juvenile Diabetes Research Foundation (JDRF) and the National Institutes of Health (USA).

Awards 
Forbes has received many awards in recognition of her research:

 2002: Young Researcher Award, International Diabetes Federation
 2006: Millennium Award for T1 Diabetes, Diabetes Australia Research Trust (DART)
 2008: Young Tall Poppy Award, Australia Institute of Policy and Science
 2010: The Commonwealth Health Minister's Award for Excellence in Health and Medical Research
 2010: NHMRC Achievement Award for highest ranked Career Development Award
 2014:  Women in Technology Life Science Award
 2016:  World Science Festival - Women in STEM Prize; Judges Choice, http://www.chiefscientist.qld.gov.au/science-comms/programs-events/partner-up-queensland/2016-events 
 2017:  TJ Neale Award for Outstanding Contribution to Nephrological Science, Australian And New Zealand Society of Nephrology https://www.nephrology.edu.au/awardsfellowshipsandgrants/award-recipients.asp 
 2017:  Sr Regis Mary Dunne Medal for Outstanding Research Contribution to Mater Group. https://www.materresearch.org.au/News-and-events/Research-News/October-2017/Mater-Research-2017-Awards-for-Research-Excellence

Research 
Forbes' research focuses on the process of advanced glycation and its contribution to diabetes and its complications, in particular kidney disease. Her recent work includes research into how advanced glycation of food by modern processing techniques and storage may be contributing to our diabetes epidemic.

Her research aims to find medicines which reduce the accumulation of products of advanced glycation, which in turn will impact the incidence of diabetes and kidney disease. Her research also aims to provide information to food regulatory authorities and health care providers about advanced glycation in food and the implications of ingesting this in excess.

So far this research has identified a class of medicines which appears to be effective for the treatment of kidney disease in diabetes, and also affects how our bodies process sugar. In the food area, she has conducted a clinical trial in overweight individuals examining the effects of advanced glycation products in food on their sugar handling and kidney function. Her team is also part of a large clinical trial tracking the consumption of advanced glycation products by mothers and their babies to see if there is an association with this and the development of Type 1 diabetes in later life.

Her work to date has resulted in more than 100 publications with more than 4500 citations.

Fellowships 

 JDRF Post Doctoral Research Fellowship, 2002-2004
 JDRF Career Development Award, 2005-2009
 NHMRC, RD Wright Career Development Award, 2005-2009
 NHMRC, Career Development Award level 2, 2010
 NHMRC Senior Research Fellowship, 2011-2015
 NHMRC Senior Research Fellowship, 2016-2020
 NHMRC Leadership Award/Fellowship Level 2, 2022-2026

References

External links 
Mater Research staff profile
The Translational Research Institute staff profile
The Conversation profile
Environmental Determinants of Islet Autoimmunity ENDIA website

Living people
Australian women scientists
1970 births